Sundeep Waslekar is an Indian thought leader on conflict resolution and global future. He is the President of Strategic Foresight Group and has authored three books on governance and several research reports on managing future challenges. Sundeep Waslekar is popularly known for developing policy concepts for peaceful change and his ideas have been discussed by the European Parliament, the House of Commons of the United Kingdom and House of Lords, the Indian Parliament, forums of the United Nations including the United Nations Security Council, World Economic Forum meetings at Davos  and Dead Sea, and other institutions. Sundeep Waslekar is a signatory to the Normandy Manifesto for World Peace, along with 4 Nobel Peace Laureates (Jody Williams, Mohamed El Baradei , Leymah Gbowee, Denis Mukwege)and an eminent philosopher, Anthony Grayling.  He is also the author of a bestselling book in Marathi Eka Dishecha Shodh that has sold 23 editions since it was first published in 2009.

Education

Sundeep Waslekar spent his childhood in Dombivli, a suburb of Mumbai, India. He obtained the Master of Commerce degree from University of Mumbai. After the graduation, he published an independent article on reforming global financial system in Financial Express. He was also invited to an international seminar on North South Dialogue hosted by Liberal International to present his views. Later on, he got the opportunity to pursue his studies in Philosophy, Politics and Economics (PPE) at St. John's College, Oxford University.

In December 2011, he was conferred D. Litt. (Doctor of Literature, Honoris Causa) of Symbiosis International University at the hands of President of India.

In 2014 he was elected Senior Research Fellow of the Centre for the Resolution of Intractable Conflicts at Harris Manchester College of Oxford.

Peace processes

In the 1980s, Waslekar contributed essays and features to newspapers such as the Ottawa Citizen, San Jose Mercury News, Hamilton Spectator and Toledo Blade. When the United Nations declared 1985 as the International Year of Peace, he led an Eight Nation Peace Mission from Rome to Ottawa. Later on, he joined the Centre for Policy Research to work on economic collaboration as means of conflict resolution in South Asia. In 1991, he founded the International Centre for Peace Initiatives, the first conflict resolution institution in South Asia which assisted with diplomatic efforts between India and Pakistan.

Following the September 11 attacks in 2001 and the War on Terror, he facilitated dialogues between Western and Islamic leaders in collaboration with the Alliance of Liberals and Democrats in the European Parliament and the League of Arab States. In 2009, he launched dialogue processes to use water to promote collaboration between traditional enemies in the Middle East, Africa and Asia.

In the early 2000s, Waslekar and Ilmas Futehally led the Strategic Foresight Group to prepare cost of conflict models for India-Pakistan, Sri Lanka and the Middle East. In 2015, he created the Water Cooperation Quotient to quantify the quality of cooperation within trans-boundary river basins worldwide. In 2017, a revised version of the Water Cooperation Quotient was launched, covering all 286 shared river basins of the world. It has political support from the InterAction Council of Former Heads of State and Government.

United Nations Security Council

In late 2015 Sundeep Waslekar worked with Senegal which had been elected as a non-permanent member of the UNSC to put water on agenda, considering outstanding track record of Senegal in fostering trans-boundary water cooperation in the Senegal and Gambia river basins. The Government of Senegal convened a series of meetings in the UN Security Council on Water, Peace and Security.

On 22 November 2016, under Senegal's chairmanship, UNSC convened an open debate in its meeting 7818 on water and peace linkages. The representatives of 69 countries participated in the debate. In his briefing, Sundeep Waslekar urged the UNSC to declare water as a “strategic asset of humanity” which would make crimes against water equivalent to crime against humanity. He also proposed new diplomatic tools to deal with violence against water infrastructure.

Governance

During the period when the world was in transition, from the fall of the Berlin Wall in 1989 to the end of the First Gulf War in 1991, he sought perspectives from 40 world leaders across all continents to prepare a blueprint of the architecture of global governance in the post Cold War era.

In the second half of the 1990s, he wrote two books on India and the neighbouring countries - South Asian Drama: Travails of Misgovernance, and Dharma Rajya: Path-breaking Reforms for India's Governance.

In 2002, he developed a new categorisation of the Indian economy based on consumption patterns rather than income levels.

In 2005, he was associated with the initiative of Paul Martin, then Canada's Prime Minister, to create a G-20 framework for global governance. It was labelled as L-20 and fructified only at the end of 2008 in response to international financial crisis.

Global Future

In an article in India's The Economic Times in August 2007 and in the Strategic Foresight Group report on Emerging Issues: 2011–2020 in January 2008, Waslekar warned about the possibility of the collapse of the global financial system. The Emerging Issues report identifies 20 drivers of change that will impact the next decade.

In his speeches at conferences of the Aspen Institute Italy and the Bertelsmann Foundation organised to reflect on global economic crisis in 2009, he presented ideas for a framework for economically inclusive and environmentally sustainable future of the world.

In 2011, he co-authored a book of essays Big Questions of Our Time  with Ilmas Futehally. The book aims to raise important questions that will face humanity from 2010 to 2060 over a wide spectrum of issues from philosophy to politics and science to security.

Partial bibliography

The New World Order, 1991, Konark Publishers Pvt Ltd 
South Asian Drama: Travails of Misgovernance, 1996, Konark Publishers Pvt Ltd 
Dharma Rajya: Path-breaking Reforms for India's Governance, 1998, Konark Publishers Pvt Ltd 
The Final Settlement : Restructuring India-Pakistan Relations, 2005, International Centre for Peace Initiatives 
An Inclusive World: In which the West, Islam and the Rest have a stake, 2007, Strategic Foresight Group 
Cost of Conflict in the Middle East , co-authored with Ilmas Futehally, 2009, Strategic Foresight Group 
 Eka dishecha Shodh  (एका दिशेचा शोध)
Big Questions of Our Time  co-author with Ilmas Futehally, 2011, Strategic Foresight Group, 
Big Questions of Our Time: The World Speaks  co-author with Ilmas Futehally, 2016, Strategic Foresight Group

References

Living people
Businesspeople from Mumbai
Year of birth missing (living people)